Galdino Flores (born 18 April 1942) is a Mexican sprinter. He competed in the men's 4 × 100 metres relay at the 1968 Summer Olympics.

References

1942 births
Living people
Athletes (track and field) at the 1968 Summer Olympics
Mexican male sprinters
Mexican male long jumpers
Olympic athletes of Mexico
Place of birth missing (living people)
Central American and Caribbean Games medalists in athletics
20th-century Mexican people